David Nalbandian was the defending champion, but did not defend his title due to a hip injury.Marcos Baghdatis won in the final 6–1, 7–5 against Olivier Rochus.

Seeds

Draw

Finals

Top half

Bottom half

External links
 Main draw
 Qualifying draw

If Stockholm Open - Singles
- Singles, 2009 If Stockholm Open